Mashhad Shahid Hasheminejad International Airport  is an international airport located in Mashhad, Razavi Khorasan, Iran.

Overview

Mashhad international airport is the Iran's second-busiest airport, behind Tehran-Mehrabad. In 2016, Mashhad Airport handled a record 10 million-plus passengers, up 17% from 2015, along with 86,681 tons of cargo. It has flights to 57 destinations, including frequent flights to 30 Iranian cities, and 27 destinations in Central Asia, the Middle East, East Asia and Europe.

Mashhad International Airport has three terminals: a domestic flight terminal (Terminal 1), an international flight terminal (Terminal 2), and a Hajj flight terminal (Terminal 3).

Airlines and destinations

The following airlines operate passenger flights at Mashhad International Airport:

Statistics

Annual traffic

Accidents and incidents 
 In 1988, a Kuwaiti Air plane from Thailand to Kuwait was hijacked and then diverted to Mashhad. The hijackers made some demands and then ordered the plane to fly to Cyprus and Algeria.
On 1 September 2006, Iran Air Tours Flight 945, a Tupolev Tu-154 flying from Bandar Abbas skidded off the Mashhad runway after a tire blew during landing. The aircraft caught fire, and 29 of the 147 people on board died in the accident.
On 24 July 2009, Aria Air Flight 1525, an Ilyushin Il-62, route THR-MHD (Teheran Mehrabad, Iran to Mashad, Iran) crashed with 173 people on board and caught fire; 5 passengers and 11 crew members died.
On 24 January 2010, Taban Air Flight 6437, a Tupolev Tu-154M, crashed while making an emergency landing at Mashhad International Airport due to a medical emergency; all 157 passengers and 13 crew survived the accident; 42 received minor injuries. It was reported that the aircraft was on an ILS landing in fog when the tail struck the ground, causing the plane to veer off the runway. This was followed by a nose gear collapse, then the right wing struck the ground, causing the aircraft to burst into flames.
 On 28 January 2016, Zagros Airlines Flight 4010 was landing at Mashhad International Airport Runway 31R when the McDonnell Douglas MD-83, registration EP-ZAB, skidded off the runway. The aircraft was damaged beyond repair and 7 people suffered minor injuries.
 On 24 May 2018, the Tapandegan (Palpitaters in Persian), an Iranian hacker group, hacked the arrival and departure monitors at Mashhad International Airport, posting anti-government messages and images on the monitors, forcing airport authorities to manually turn off the monitors one by one.

See also 
 List of the busiest airports in Iran
 Tehran's International Airport
 Mashhad
 Iran

References

External links 

 Mashhad International Airport 
 Iranian Airport Agency 

Airports in Iran
Buildings and structures in Mashhad
Transportation in Razavi Khorasan Province